Bottrop Hauptbahnof is a railway station in Bottrop, North Rhine-Westphalia, Germany. It is located on the Oberhausen-Osterfeld Süd – Hamm railway and Essen–Bottrop railway and is served by RE and S-Bahn services operated by DB and NordWestBahn.

History 
On 12 November 1879, the Royal Westphalian Railway Company opened the Horst–Osterfeld section of its Welver-Sterkrade line, but failed to build a station in Bottrop city. Just one year later the company was nationalised and the line was partly dismantled.

On 1 May 1905 the Prussian state railways opened the Oberhausen-Osterfeld Süd–Hamm railway, which runs parallel to the Westphalian route from Osterfeld Süd to the east for about four kilometres to the current Bottrop Hauptbahnhof and then swings to the north. On this line a station was opened nearly half a kilometre east of the present station then called West Bottrop station. This station was designed with station building on an island between two tracks to the east of Bahnhofsstraße.

At about the same time, the Bottrop CME station of the former Cologne-Minden Railway Company on the Duisburg-Ruhrort–Dortmund railway was renamed Bottrop Süd and the Bottrop RhE station of the former Rhenish Railway Company on the Duisburg–Quakenbrück railway was renamed Bottrop Nord.

The Bottrop West station quickly surpassed the two older stations in importance and it was renamed Bottrop station in 1914. Finally between 1927 and 1936 it was renamed Bottrop Hauptbahnhof, following the opening on 1 July 1922 of a new connecting line to the Mülheim-Heißen–Oberhausen-Osterfeld Nord railway.

After the Second World War, the "Westphalian line" from Bottrop was not restored to operation and was partly dismantled. Bottrop Nord station was closed on 29 May 1960 and Bottrop Süd station followed 14 years later on 26 May 1974.

The old station building too large for its traffic and poorly located and it was demolished in 1995 and a new normal through station was built nearly half a kilometre to the west between Bahnhofstrasse and Essener Straße.

Train services

Special 15 min tact RE14 / S9 : Gladbeck West - Bottrop Hbf -  Essen-Borbeck - Essen Hbf

The following services currently call at Bottrop Hauptbahnhof:

References

External links 

Railway stations in North Rhine-Westphalia
Hauptbahnhof
S9 (Rhine-Ruhr S-Bahn)
Rhine-Ruhr S-Bahn stations
Railway stations in Germany opened in 1905